The St George's Cricket Club was originally located in Manhattan, New York it later moved to Hoboken, New Jersey. Its name comes from its association with St. George's Episcopal Church at Stuyvesant Square, Manhattan. It hosted the first international cricket match in 1844, between Canada and the United States. The club was founded in 1838. Nicknamed the Dragonslayers, the SGCC set the standard of US cricket from 1838 to the Civil War.

History
The St George's Cricket Club was originally located in Manhattan, New York it later moved to Hoboken, New Jersey. Its name comes from its association with St. George's Episcopal Church at Stuyvesant Square, Manhattan. It hosted the first international cricket match in 1844, between Canada and the United States. The club was founded in 1838. Nicknamed the Dragonslayers, the SGCC set the standard of US cricket from 1838 to the Civil War. 

Most of its playing members were British-born and excluded Americans from participating in their "English game". The local resentment of this English social exclusivity amongst New York ball players may have been the impetus for cricket to be designated as an "English" game in the US, though it had been played for over a century at the time. The SGCC club traveled to Canada on several occasions in the 1850s, encouraging a touring tradition for American sports which culminated in George Parr's All England XI visiting New York, Philadelphia, and Montreal in 1859. This was the first occasion that a professional team of players in any sport had played in the United States. The All England Team of professionals played a US XXII team that included five SGCC players. 

St George's continued its dominant New York cricket organizational role until 1876, when the founding of the New York Metropolitan league and the Staten Island Cricket and Baseball Club at Walker Park ushered in a new era of league cricket in New York. Its first ground was located in Midtown Manhattan off of Bloomingdale Road (now Broadway) between 30th and 31st Street. The ground was located behind the Casper Samler farmstead, which was later replaced by the Gilsey Hotel. This ground was the site of many matches, including the first international cricket match in 1844. In the 1850s, economic development in Midtown necessitated that the club move to a new ground in Harlem. This ground was known colloquially and in news articles as the "Red House" ground and was located between what is now 105th and 106th streets and First Avenue. The Red House ground played host to domestic competitions between teams from New York and Philadelphia, as well as international matches with Canadian teams including the 1853 match between the US and Canada. Ultimately, the team relocated to Hoboken, New Jersey. After the Civil War, St George's was slated to get a ground in Central Park before moving to Hudson City. St George's opponents included the Staten Island Cricket and Baseball Club, the Philadelphia Cricket Club, and the Toronto Cricket Club.  George Wright includes a picture of St George's cricket grounds in his biography.

George Wright's older brother Harry also played for St George's team. The Wrights' father, Samuel, was the professional groundskeeper for team and is depicted, along with his son Harry, in a famous daguerreotype holding a cricket bat while Harry holds a baseball bat.

Notes

References

American club cricket teams
1838 establishments in New York (state)
Cricket clubs established in 1838
Sports in Manhattan
Cricket teams in New York City